Insurgentes Sur is a station on Line 12 of the Mexico City Metro. The station is located between Mixcoac and  Hospital 20 de Noviembre. It was opened on 30 October 2012 as part of the first stretch of Line 12 between Mixcoac and Tláhuac. It is built underground.

General information

The station is located south of the city center, at the intersection between Avenida de los Insurgentes, Eje 7 Sur Extremadura, and Eje 7 Félix Cuevas, in the Benito Juárez borough. The station, thus, receives its name from being at the southern section of the Avenida de los Insurgentes.

The icon for the station depicts Miguel Hidalgo and José Morelos, two of the main rebel leaders during the Mexican War of Independence.

The station serves the following neighborhoods: Colonia del Valle, Tlacoquemecatl del Valle, Extremadura Insurgentes, and San José Insurgentes.

In the initial Line 12 plans, the station was to be named Extremadura, due to its location at the intersection of Avenida de los Insurgentes Sur and Eje 7 Sur, which receives the name of Félix Cuevas to the east of Avenida de los Insurgentes, and Extremadura to the west of the Insurgentes avenue.

Ridership

Station layout

Nearby

Parque Hundido, park.
Parque San Lorenzo, park.

Exits
Northwest: Avenida de los Insurgentes Sur and Eje 7 Sur Félix Cuevas, Col. Tlacoquemécatl del Valle
Southwest: Avenida de los Insurgentes Sur and Eje 7 Sur Félix Cuevas, Col. Actipán
Northeast: Eje 7 Sur Félix Cuevas and Tejocotes street, Col. Tlacoquemécatl del Valle

Gallery

References

External links 
 

Insurgentes Sur
Railway stations opened in 2012
2012 establishments in Mexico
Mexico City Metro stations in Benito Juárez, Mexico City
Accessible Mexico City Metro stations